St Mark's Church School is an independent Anglican co-educational school in Wellington, New Zealand for children aged from two (Early Childhood) to Year 8. The school is often seen on cricket match broadcasts from Basin Reserve. To its front is the modern, 1970s-era church building, the parish church to which the school is attached. A wooden church stood in its place prior to the 1970s redevelopment.

Its first principal was Miss Annie Holm, who served the school until the 1940s, aided by her sister. The school's library is named after her. The Rev Ronald Kirby was another long-serving and influential principal, from 1971 to his death in 1982; the school's main block is named in his honour. The vicar of St. Mark's Church, Rev. Matthew Calder, taught Religious Education for all that time, and presided over Rev. Kirby's funeral; another block is named the Calder Block for him.

Notable alumni
Raybon Kan, comedian
Karl Urban, actor
Ray Wallace, Mayor of Lower Hutt

References

External links
2010 Education Review Office report

Educational institutions established in 1917
Primary schools in New Zealand
Schools in Wellington City
1917 establishments in New Zealand